HMS Kempenfelt was a C-class destroyer built for the Royal Navy in the early 1930s.  A flotilla leader, she saw service in the Home Fleet before World War II and the ship made several deployments to Spanish waters during the Spanish Civil War, enforcing the arms blockade imposed by Britain and France on both sides of the conflict.

Kempenfelt was transferred to the Royal Canadian Navy (RCN) in 1939 and renamed HMCS Assiniboine. During World War II, she served as a convoy escort in the battle of the Atlantic, sinking one German submarine by ramming, on anti-submarine patrols during the invasion of Normandy, and was employed as a troop transport after VE Day for returning Canadian servicemen, before being decommissioned in mid-1945.

Assiniboine was sold for scrap in 1945, but she ran aground while being towed to the breakers and was not broken up until 1952.

Design and construction
Steam for the turbines was provided by three Yarrow water-tube boilers. The ship's complement was 175 officers and men.

The ship mounted four 45-calibre 4.7-inch Mark IX guns in single mounts, designated 'A', 'B', 'X', and 'Y' from front to rear. For anti-aircraft (AA) defence, Kempenfelt had a single QF 3-inch 20 cwt AA gun between her funnels, and two  QF 2-pounder Mk II AA guns mounted on the aft end of her forecastle deck. The  AA gun was removed in 1936 and the 2-pounders were relocated to between the funnels. She was fitted with two above-water quadruple torpedo tube mounts for 21-inch torpedoes. Three depth-charge chutes were fitted, each with a capacity of two depth charges. After World War II began this was increased to 33 depth charges, delivered by one or two rails and two throwers.

The changes made to Assiniboines armament during the war (dates can only be roughly assigned) were first the replacement of the ship's rear torpedo tube mount by a 12-pounder AA gun and the 2-pounders were exchanged for quadruple Mark I mounts for the QF 0.5-inch Vickers Mk III machine gun. Later, 'Y' gun was also removed to allow her depth charge stowage to be increased to at least 60 depth charges. 'X' gun was later removed and the 12-pounder was resited in its place to further increase her depth charge capacity. Later changes included fitting a split Hedgehog anti-submarine spigot mortar on each side of 'A' gun, exchanging her two quadruple .50-calibre Vickers machine guns mounted between her funnels for two Oerlikon 20 mm AA guns, and the addition of two Oerlikon guns to her searchlight platform. The ship's director-control tower and rangefinder above the bridge were removed in exchange for a Type 271 target indication radar. A Type 286 short-range surface search radar was also added as was an HF/DF radio direction finder on a short mainmast.

The ship was ordered on 15 July 1930 from J. Samuel White at Cowes under the 1929 Programme. Kempenfelt was laid down on 18 October 1930, launched on 30 September 1931, as the 2nd ship to carry the name, and completed on 30 May 1932. Built as a flotilla leader, she displaced 15 long tons more than the rest of her class and carried an extra 30 personnel. These personnel formed the staff of the Captain (D) of the flotilla.

Service
Kempenfelt was assigned to the 2nd Destroyer Flotilla, of the Home Fleet, after her commissioning. The ship briefly mounted an experimental  gun on 'B' mount for evaluation purposes during this time; it was replaced by the standard 4.7-inch gun. She was based at Rosyth for most of the rest of 1932, but visited the Mediterranean between January and March 1933 before returning home. The ship was given a refit at Devonport that ended in January 1934. Shortly afterwards, Kempenfelt participated in the Home Fleet's tour of the West Indies that ended in March. The ship visited various Scandinavian ports during the remainder of the year. She participated in King George V's Silver Jubilee Fleet Review at Spithead on 16 July 1935. Following the Italian invasion of Abyssinia, Kempenfelt was sent in August to the Red Sea with the other ships of the 2nd Flotilla to monitor Italian warship movements until April 1936. She was given a brief refit at Devonport that lasted until June upon her return to the UK. During the first stages of the Spanish Civil War in late 1936, the ship evacuated British nationals from several different Spanish ports.

In December, Kempenfelt began a more thorough refit at Devonport that lasted until 10 April 1937 and returned to Spanish waters afterwards to intercept shipping carrying contraband goods to Spain and to protect British-flagged ships. On 6 March, the ship and the destroyer , rescued survivors from the Nationalist heavy cruiser  after she had been sunk by Republican destroyers during the Battle of Cape Palos. She was refitted at Chatham in May–June 1938 and made a number of port visits in Scandinavia the following month. Kempenfelt was transferred to the Portsmouth Local Flotilla and remained there until the war began in September 1939.

Wartime service and transfer
The ship was transferred to the 18th Destroyer Flotilla, based at the Isle of Portland, where she escorted shipping and conducted anti-submarine patrols. Kempenfelt had been purchased before the war began by the Canadian government, but it agreed to allow the British to retain her until the Royal Navy could compensate for her loss by requisitioning enough auxiliary anti-submarine vessels. By the time that the British were ready to turn her over to the RCN, the ship was under repair after a collision and the hand over was delayed until 19 October. She was renamed Assiniboine and arrived at Halifax, Nova Scotia on 17 November. The ship had not yet been fitting with the steam heating necessary to operate in a Canadian winter and she was transferred to the Caribbean in exchange for the destroyer . Assiniboine arrived at Kingston, Jamaica, on 8 December.

Assigned to the North America and West Indies Station, the highlight of the ship's service in the Caribbean was the capture of the German blockade runner  in the Mona Passage between the islands of Hispaniola and Puerto Rico on the night of 8/9 March 1940. Initially intercepted by the light cruiser , the crew of Hannover disabled their steering gear and set the ship on fire. Assiniboine took the burning ship under tow to prevent her from entering the waters of the neutral Dominican Republic while the cruiser sprayed water on the fire. The two ships swapped roles in the morning and the destroyer put some of her crew aboard Hannover to help Dunedins boarding party fight the fire while the cruiser towed the freighter to Kingston. Assiniboine arrived in Halifax on 31 March for a refit.

After the completion of her refit, the ship escorted local convoys in and around Halifax until 15 January 1941 when she was transferred to Greenock and assigned to the 10th Escort Group of the Mid-Ocean Escort Force that was based there. Her repairs were not completed until 22 May and she was transferred to St. John's, Newfoundland in June to reinforce escort forces in the Western Atlantic. In early August, Assiniboine, her sister  and the ex-American destroyer , escorted the battleship  to Placentia Bay where Prime Minister Winston Churchill met President Franklin Roosevelt for the first time.

Whilst escorting Convoy SC 94 in early August 1942 as part of Escort Group C1, Assiniboines Type 286 radar spotted  in a heavy fog on 6 August. The destroyer closed on the contact and briefly spotted the submarine twice before losing her in the fog. The range was too close for Assiniboines 4.7-inch guns to engage, but her .50-calibre machine guns shot up the submarine's deck and conning tower. This kept the Germans from manning their  deck gun, but the  flak gun was already manned and firing. The gun punched holes through the destroyer's plating that set some petrol tanks on the deck afire and disabled 'A' gun. It also claimed the only Canadian casualty during the engagement: Ordinary Seaman Kenneth "Wiley" Watson from Revelestoke, British Columbia. The destroyer was unable to ram U-210 until the rear 4.7-inch gun hit the conning tower, killing the entire bridge crew and the .50-caliber machine guns were able to silence the flak gun. This caused Lieutenant Sorber, the senior surviving officer, to order the submarine to dive, but this meant that she had to hold a straight course while doing so. Assiniboine was able to take advantage of this and rammed U-210 abaft the conning tower whilst she was diving. This caused the electric motors to fail, damaged her propellers and led to water entering the submarine, as a result of which Sorber ordered the ballast tanks to be blown and the submarine abandoned. The destroyer rammed her again when U-210 resurfaced, dropped a pattern of depth charges set to detonate at shallow depth and hit her one more time with a 4.7-inch shell before the submarine finally sank. A number of survivors were rescued by Assiniboine and the British corvette , before the former ship had to head home for repairs as she was taking on water below the waterline. She required nearly two months of repairs at Halifax and was assigned to Escort Group C3 when they were completed on 20 December.

Whilst en route to Londonderry, Assiniboine dropped a shallow pattern of depth charges on a submarine contact and badly damaged her stern on 2 March 1943. The ship was repaired at Liverpool between 7 March and 13 July and then assigned to Escort Group C1. She continued her escort work until April 1944 when she began a refit at Shelburne, Nova Scotia. Upon its completion in July, Assiniboine was assigned to the Western Approaches Command. The following month, the 12th Support Group, including Assiniboine, engaged three German minesweepers on 12 August, without sinking any.

Assiniboine returned to Canada in June and was briefly used as a troop transport before a boiler room fire on 4 July effectively ended her career. She was paid off on 8 August and placed on the disposal list. Whilst on tow to the breakers in Baltimore, she ran aground near East Point, Prince Edward Island. Attempts to get her off failed, and she was left to rust until eventually being broken up in place in 1952.

Trans-Atlantic convoys escorted

Notes

Footnotes

References

External links
 HMCS Assiniboine at The Royal Canadian Navy Historical Project
 HMS Kempenfelts career at NavalHistory.net
 HMS Kempenfelt at Uboat.net

 

Ships of the Royal Canadian Navy
C and D-class destroyers
World War II destroyers of the United Kingdom
1931 ships
Maritime incidents in November 1945
Shipwrecks of the Prince Edward Island coast

de:HMCS Assiniboine (D18)